The men's javelin throw athletics events for the 2016 Summer Paralympics take place at the Rio Olympic Stadium from 9 September. A total of 6 events are contested for 6 different classifications.

Competition format 
The competition for each classification consisted of a single round. Each athlete threw three times, after which the eight best threw three more times (with the best distance of the six throws counted).

Schedule

Medal summary

Results

F13
The F13 event took place on 14 September.

F34
The F34 event took place on 15 September.

F38
The F38 event took place on 15 September.

F41
The F41 event took place on 11 September. It was open to both F40 and F41 classification athletes.

F44
The F44 event took place on 9 September. It was open to F42, F43 and F44 classification athletes.

F46

F57

References

Athletics at the 2016 Summer Paralympics
2016 in men's athletics